The Muisne River is a river of Ecuador that enters the Pacific Ocean in the Esmeraldas Province.

The Muisne River is the main river in Cojimíes sub-region of the Manabí mangroves ecoregion.
It discharges  into the Pacific.
The low-keyed Muisne resort is in the northern part of the Ensenada de Mompiche, on a  sand bar among the mangroves of the Muisne River estuary.
It may be reached by ferry across the Muisne River from the small town of El Relleno.

See also
List of rivers of Ecuador

References

Sources

Rivers of Ecuador